KVM may refer to:

Computing
 Kernel-based Virtual Machine, a virtualization solution that turns the Linux kernel into a hypervisor
 K virtual machine, for Java

Keyboard–screen–mouse
 KVM switch (keyboard, video, and mouse switch), a hardware device for controlling multiple computers
 Rackmount KVM, a computer input/output device offering the combination of a keyboard, video monitor and mouse (pointing device), typically rack mounted

Other 
 K. V. Mahadevan, South Indian music composer
 Kalamazoo Valley Museum, a museum in Michigan, US
 Kheti Virasat Mission, a farmers' movement in Punjab
 Kosovo Verification Mission
 KV Mechelen, a Belgian football (soccer) club